The 1974 Western Kentucky football team represented Western Kentucky University during the 1974 NCAA Division II football season. Coming off a 12-1 and NCAA Playoff Runners-up season the previous year, WKU started the season ranked number 1 in both the AP and UPI national polls.  They ended up losing their last two games, finished tied for 2nd in the conference, and missed the NCAA Playoffs.
The team's roster included future National Football League (NFL) players Virgil Livers, John Bushong, David Carter, Rick Caswell, and Biff Madon.  Livers and Bushong were named to the AP All-American team, and Livers was also named OVC Defensive Player of the Year.  The All OVC team included Livers, Bushong, Rick Green, David Carter, John Humphrey, and Keith Tandy.  The coaching staff included future NFL coach Romeo Crennel.

Schedule

References

Western Kentucky
Western Kentucky Hilltoppers football seasons
Western Kentucky Hilltoppers football